Marianna Longa (born 26 August 1979 in Tirano) is an Italian cross-country skier from Livigno. She started her professional career in 1997, and her first appearance in a world cup race was on 17 March 2000 in Bormio. Longa is currently part of the Fiamme Gialle, and the Italian cross-country national team. Longa is also a strong runner. She retired from cross-country skiing after the 2010–11 season.

Biography

Early life

In the early ages she excelled in all the major national, and international races. She approached the professional level at the age of 18, in 1997. In her first year, she obtained ninth place in the 5 km freestyle, at the 1997 FIS Junior World Ski Championships in Canmore, Canada.

In 1999, she achieved a podium position at the FIS Junior World Ski Championships in Saalfelden, Austria with a 3rd place in the 5 km C, a race where athletes like Marit Bjørgen, Petra Majdič, and Aino-Kaisa Saarinen were also competing. Longa also earned great results in the Continental Cup, including the win at the 5 km classical stage in Candanchu, Spain where she preceded Majdič|.

World Cup debut

Between 2000 and 2001 she was competing in both the Continental Cup, and the World Cup. The top result was a second position in the 5 km classical in Schonach, Germany in the Continental Cup. She ended the 2001 season in 85th position in the overall World Cup standings.

Winter Olympics and World Ski Championships Debuts

In the 2002 Winter Olympics, in Salt Lake City, at the age of 22, she obtained 6th position in the 4 × 5 km relay, and a 20th position in the 10 km classical. 
She ended the 2002 season in 80th position in the World Cup overall standings

In the 2003 World Ski Championships, in Val di Fiemme, she finished 7th in the 4 × 5 km relay and 11th in the 15 km C Mass start. 
Longa ended the 2003 season in 51st position in the world cup overall standing achieving a 7th place in the 10 km classical mass start as top result.

Pregnancy and return to competitions 2004 - 2008
Between the 2004 and 2006 she did not obtain major results as a consequence of her pregnancy, announced in February 2005.  In the 2007 World Ski Championship, in Sapporo, Japan, she obtained eight position in the 15 km M Pursuit, and sixth in the 4 × 5 km relay. The best individual result in 2007 is fifth place in the 10 km classical in Otepaeae, Estonia. She ended the season with an overall 19th position in the world cup standing. In March 2007, she retired, at the end of her best world cup season so far. Although the decision to retire, taken one year earlier, Longa gave her come back already in March 2008.

Longa had a brilliant start on returning to competition, with a fifth place on the 10 km classical World Cup in Lathi, Finland. The 2008 also brought a fourth place on the 10 km classical, and a fifth place on the 10 km freestyle pursuit in the World Cup Finals in Bormio. In the summer of 2008 she also competed in roller skiing races to speed-up her recovery, obtaining a victory, two seconds and a fourth place.

From 2009
On 30 January 2009 she won her first world cup race in Rybinsk, Russia on the 10 km F Mass start. A month after, she won two medals at the 2009 FIS Nordic World Ski Championship in Liberec with a silver in the 10 km C and bronze in the team sprint C event. 
She finished the 2009 season in sixth position in the overall World Cup Standings.

In the 2010 Winter Olympics in Vancouver, she earned fourth place in the relay 4 × 5 km relay, seventh place in the 15 km pursuit, and eleventh in the 30 km classical. She ended the 2010 World Cup season in ninth position in the overall standings, with the major World Cup results of a third in Lahti in the 4 × 5 km relay, and a fourth place in the 10 km classical in Rukatunturi, Finland

In January 2011 she obtained third place in the 2010-11 Tour de Ski, arriving third on the final climb finish in Val di Fiemme, following Justyna Kowalczyk and Therese Johaug. The 2011 season brought several good results in all the different disciplines, with a total of six podium positions in World Cup races, and three podium positions in Stage World Cup races.

2011 World Championships, Oslo

Longa did not compete at the starting race in the world championship, the sprint won by Marit Bjørgen. 
She took start at the 15 km pursuit and finished 5th, following Bjørgen, Justyna Kowalczyk, Therese Johaug and Charlotte Kalla. 
At the 10 km classical she finished seventh. Longa also participated at the Team Sprint, completing the Italian team together with Arianna Follis. They secured the fourth position, following in order of Sweden, Finland and Norway.
In the relay 4 × 5 km relay, together with Follis, Antonella Confortola and Silvia Rupil, Longa secured the fourth position, with a start that saw her in the first place after her fraction.
On the last race, the 30 km, she obtained the eight position in a spectacular day, where Johaug offered an outstanding performance securing the gold medal ahead of Bjørgen and Kowalczyk.

Cross-country skiing results
All results are sourced from the International Ski Federation (FIS).

Olympic Games

World Championships
 2 medals – (1 silver, 1 bronze)

World Cup

Season standings

Individual podiums
1 victory – (1 ) 
9 podiums – (5 , 4 )

Team podiums
 1 victory – (1 ) 
 6 podiums – (5 , 1 )

References

External links
 
 
 
 Unofficial Fan website 

1979 births
Cross-country skiers at the 2002 Winter Olympics
Cross-country skiers at the 2010 Winter Olympics
Italian female cross-country skiers
Living people
Olympic cross-country skiers of Italy
Cross-country skiers of Fiamme Gialle
FIS Nordic World Ski Championships medalists in cross-country skiing
Tour de Ski skiers